Millennium Media (formerly Millennium Films) is an American film production and financing company that was founded by Avi Lerner, Trevor Short, Danny Dimbort, and Danny Lerner in 1992 and is one of Hollywood's longest running independent film companies. Millennium creates, produces, finances, and sells films worldwide. The company produces action films, most of which are filmed primarily in South Africa and Bulgaria (by 2005, it acquired Nu Boyana Film Studios), among other locations.

History

Nu Metro Entertainment 
In the mid-1980's, The Cannon Group, Inc. began expanding its operation into Africa, taking advantage of cheap locations and labor in countries such as Zimbabwe and South Africa. Avi Lerner opened Nu Metro Entertainment, a film production company based in Johannesburg to accommodate production demands in the country. During this time, Lerner executive produced many films, such as American Ninja 2: The Confrontation and River of Death for Cannon as well as Howling IV: The Original Nightmare for Harry Alan Towers. After pressure from anti-apartheid forces the company closed its African operation in 1988, Lerner created a new company, Nu Image, to produce original, low budget films alongside his brother Danny Lerner and other Cannon employees Trevor Short, Danny Dimbort and Boaz Davidson.

Nu Image 
From 1992, Nu Image began multiple films a year, mainly in the action genre. Many of the films produced went direct-to-video, however some, such as Shark Attack debuted on television. Many stars, writers and directors from The Cannon Group, Inc. appeared in films for Nu Image, including David Bradley, Michael Dudikoff, Sam Firstenberg and Billy Drago. They also built a new generation of action talent such as Bryan Genesse and Joe Lara.

However, their efforts to break into the mainstream with mockbusters such as Freefall starring Eric Roberts, Jeff Fahey and Pamela Gidley, created to capitalise on the success of Sylvester Stallone's Cliffhanger failed to make much of an impact. Freefall ended up going direct-to-video.

After the successes of creature features such as Anaconda and Deep Blue Sea released in the late 90's, Nu Image produced a spate of low budget franchises to capitalise on the trend including; Tobe Hooper's Crocodile, Shark Attack, Spiders, Killer Rats, Octopus and Raging Sharks and various sequels were produced from 1999 to 2005. While not critically successful, the films were extremely successful on television and home media.

Millennium Films & Millennium Entertainment 

From the mid-2000's, Nu Image gradually began producing fewer films, with its subsidiary label, Millennium Films, releasing more with a greater level of financing than previously, and its sister company Millennium Entertainment producing the films. In 2005, it purchased Nu Boyana Film Studios in Bulgaria. One of the first films to carry the new name was the remake The Wicker Man starring Nicolas Cage. The film was a critical and commercial failure. They continued on with a focus on sequels and remakes of notable properties such as Day of the Dead and Rambo. After the commercial success of Rambo, Millennium Films entered into a multi-year deal with Lionsgate to produce several big-budgeted films, the first of which was Conan the Barbarian. The deal would be extended over the years with successful box-office hits (The Mechanic) and box office bombs (The Legend of Hercules). Another notable success was Olympus Has Fallen starring Gerard Butler. The film was originally intended as a mockbuster of White House Down; however the film ended up beating that film into release and was much more profitable, spawning two sequels to date.

Millennium Entertainment was sold in August 2014. The company's library and distribution assets had been sold to a consortium consisting of its current management and Virgo Investment Group. The new owners renamed the company Alchemy in January 2015, finally cutting ties to its former sister company Millennium Films, which remained under the control of Avi Lerner. Alchemy filed for Chapter 7 Bankruptcy on June 30, 2016.

Millennium Media 
In 2017, a deal was reached with The Recon Group, a Chinese investment firm, for them to purchase a majority stake in Millennium Films. The deal was signed and a $20 million downpayment was secured. However, this deal was later announced to be off in August 2017 due to the Chinese government clamping down on overseas business investments. The following year, the company was rebranded as Millennium Media.

Films

References

External links
Avi Lerner’s Millennium Entertainment Up for Sale (EXCLUSIVE) on Variety.com

 
Film distributors of the United States
Film production companies of the United States
Mass media companies established in 1992
Companies based in Los Angeles
Non-theatrical film production companies
1992 establishments in California
International sales agents